In number theory, quadratic Gauss sums are certain finite sums of roots of unity. A quadratic Gauss sum can be interpreted as a linear combination of the values of the complex exponential function with coefficients given by a quadratic character; for a general character, one obtains a more general Gauss sum. These objects are named after Carl Friedrich Gauss, who studied them extensively and applied them to quadratic, cubic, and biquadratic reciprocity laws.

Definition 

For an odd prime number  and an integer , the quadratic Gauss sum  is defined as
 
where  is a primitive th root of unity, for example .
Equivalently, 
 
Hence, we have
 
 
where
 
is the Gauss sum defined for any character  modulo .

Properties 

 The value of the Gauss sum is an algebraic integer in the th cyclotomic field .
 The evaluation of the Gauss sum for an integer  not divisible by a prime  can be reduced to the case :
 

 

 Remark
In fact, the identity
 
was easy to prove and led to one of Gauss's proofs of quadratic reciprocity. However, the determination of the sign of the Gauss sum turned out to be considerably more difficult: Gauss could only establish it after several years' work. Later, Dirichlet, Kronecker, Schur and other mathematicians found different proofs.

Generalized quadratic Gauss sums 

Let  be natural numbers. The generalized quadratic Gauss sum  is defined by

The classical quadratic Gauss sum is the sum .

 Properties

Gauss sums are multiplicative, i.e. given natural numbers  with  one has

This is a direct consequence of the Chinese remainder theorem.

One has  if  except if  divides  in which case one has

Thus in the evaluation of quadratic Gauss sums one may always assume .

One has the following analogue of the quadratic reciprocity law for (even more general) Gauss sums

Define

for every odd integer .

Here  is the Jacobi symbol. This is the famous formula of Carl Friedrich Gauss.

 For  the Gauss sums can easily be computed by completing the square in most cases. This fails however in some cases (for example,  even and  odd), which can be computed relatively easy by other means. For example, if  is odd and  one has

If  is odd then  is even for all . Because of a counting argument  runs through all even residue classes modulo  exactly two times. The geometric sum formula then shows that .

If  is not squarefree then the right side vanishes while the left side does not. Often the right sum is also called a quadratic Gauss sum.

Another useful formula

See also

Gauss sum
Gaussian period
Kummer sum
Landsberg–Schaar relation

References

Cyclotomic fields